Houbi is a railway station on the Taiwan Railways Administration West Coast line located in Houbi District, Tainan, Taiwan.

History
The station was opened on 20 April 1903.

Architecture
The station is a wooden structure.

Around the station
 Houbi Huang Family Mansion

See also
 List of railway stations in Taiwan

References 

1903 establishments in Taiwan
Railway stations in Tainan
Railway stations opened in 1903
Railway stations served by Taiwan Railways Administration